Electric Road is a street in the north of Hong Kong Island in the Eastern District of Hong Kong. It spans from the Tin Hau area of Causeway Bay, across Fortress Hill of North Point and connects east onto Java Road in North Point.

History
Electric Road remained unnamed when the Hong Kong Tramway was completed in 1904. In 1913, Hongkong Electric built a new power station on the new reclamation of North Point to replace the one in Wan Chai. Its operation was delayed until summer 1919 because of World War I. The operation of the power station spurred the development of North Point. In 1929 after the improvement of the road, it was named 'Electric Road' after the power station. Before the completion of King's Road, it was the busiest road in North Point.

North Point Power Station was officially decommissioned in 1978. The site is now part of the large scale City Garden housing development.

Features
 Nos. 89 and 91 Electric Road are two tong lau built between 1947 and 1951
 Causeway Bay Market (No. 142)
 Ngo Wong Temple (No. 158-160)
 @Convoy (No 169)
 AIA Tower (No. 183)
 Former Royal Hong Kong Yacht Club clubhouse
 North Point Fire Station
 Towngas Headquarters
 Hong Kong Funeral Home
 North Point Government Office
 Electric Road Municipal Services Building (No. 229)
 Kodak House
 City Garden, a private residential development (No. 233)
 Sea View Estate

See also
 List of streets and roads in Hong Kong

References

Tin Hau, Hong Kong
Fortress Hill
North Point
Roads on Hong Kong Island